The 2011–12 NOJHL season is the 34th season of the Northern Ontario Junior Hockey League (NOJHL). The seven teams of the East and West Divisions will play 50-game schedules.

Come February, the top teams of each division will play down for the Copeland-McNamara Trophy, the NOJHL championship.  The winner of the Copeland-McNamara Trophy will compete in the Central Canadian Junior "A" championship, the Dudley Hewitt Cup.  If successful against the winners of the Ontario Junior Hockey League and Superior International Junior Hockey League, the champion would then move on to play in the Canadian Junior Hockey League championship, the 2012 Royal Bank Cup.

Changes 
Sudbury Jr. Wolves change their name to the Sudbury Cubs.
Manitoulin Islanders move to Kirkland Lake, Ontario and become Kirkland Lake Blue Devils.
Temiscaming Royals ceased operations.
Kirkland Lake Blue Devils (7-28-1) are sold mid-season and renamed Kirkland Lake Gold Miners.

Current Standings 
Note: GP = Games played; W = Wins; L = Losses; OTL = Overtime losses; SL = Shootout losses; GF = Goals for; GA = Goals against; PTS = Points; x = clinched playoff berth; y = clinched division title; z = clinched conference title

Teams listed on the official league website.

Standings listed on official league website.

2011-12 Copeland-McNamara Trophy Playoffs

West Semi-final round robin

Playoff results are listed on the official league website.

Dudley Hewitt Cup Championship
Hosted by the Thunder Bay North Stars in Thunder Bay, Ontario.  The Soo Thunderbirds won the tournament and move on to the 2012 Royal Bank Cup.

Round Robin
Soo Thunderbirds 4 - Wisconsin Wilderness (SIJHL) 3 in overtime
Soo Thunderbirds 4 - Thunder Bay North Stars (SIJHL) 3
Stouffville Spirit (OJHL) 10 - Soo Thunderbirds 2
Semi-final
Soo Thunderbirds 8 - Thunder Bay North Stars (SIJHL) 5
Final
Soo Thunderbirds 5 - Stouffville Spirit (OJHL) 3

2012 Royal Bank Cup Championship
Hosted by the Humboldt Broncos in Humboldt Broncos. Soo Thunderbirds finished second in the round robin but were eliminated in the semi-final.

Round Robin
Soo Thunderbirds 2 - Penticton Vees (BCHL) 1
Portage Terriers (MJHL) 4 - Soo Thunderbirds 3 in double overtime
Humboldt Broncos (SJHL) 3 - Soo Thunderbirds 0
Soo Thunderbirds 7 - Woodstock Slammers (MHL) 4

Semi-final
Penticton Vees (BCHL) 3 - Soo Thunderbirds 0

Scoring leaders 
Note: GP = Games played; G = Goals; A = Assists; Pts = Points; PIM = Penalty minutes

Leading goaltenders 
Note: GP = Games played; Mins = Minutes played; W = Wins; L = Losses: OTL = Overtime losses; SL = Shootout losses; GA = Goals Allowed; SO = Shutouts; GAA = Goals against average

Players selected in 2012 NHL Entry Draft
To be decided after season ends.

Awards
To be decided after season ends.

See also 
 2012 Royal Bank Cup
 Dudley Hewitt Cup
 List of NOHA Junior A seasons
 Ontario Junior Hockey League
 Superior International Junior Hockey League
 Greater Ontario Junior Hockey League

References

External links
 Official website of the Northern Ontario Junior Hockey League
 Official website of the Canadian Junior Hockey League

NOJHL
Northern Ontario Junior Hockey League seasons